Zabari may refer to:
 Žabari
 Zabari, Iran (disambiguation)